Lars Harms may refer to:

 Lars Harms (squash player)
 Lars Harms (politician)